Jean-Georges Kastner, born 9 March 1810 in Strasbourg, died 19 December 1867 in Paris, was a composer and musicologist.

Biography

Kastner's parents were Johann Georg Kastner, from Dettwiller, and Marie Salome Pfeiffer, from Woerth. Despite his interest in music, Kastner studied theology at the University of Strasbourg at the request of his father from 1827 to 1832. After the premiere of his opera The Queen of the Sarmatian in 1835 in Strasbourg, the city council granted him a scholarship to the Paris Conservatoire where he studied with Anton Reicha and Henri Montan Berton.

Kastner's strongest interest was in wind music, and he was especially interested in the instrumental inventions of Adolphe Sax. His compositions for saxhorn and alto saxophone were among the earliest works written for these instruments. Included in his Manuel général de musique militaire (1848) are some of the earliest illustrations of Sax's instruments.

On 16 May 1837 he married his student in Paris, Léonie Kastner-Boursault. Since Léonie was wealthy, her husband could practice his profession without any financial worries. Kastner was the father of physician and musician Frédéric Kastner, inventor of the pyrophone.

Works

Livres-partitions 
La danse macabre, 1852
 Les Chants de la vie, 1854
Le chant de l'armée française, 1855
 Les cris de Paris, 1857
 La rève d'Oswald on les sirènes, 1856

Literature

 Manuel général de musique militaire à l'usage des armées françaises, Firmin Didot Frères, 1848
 Les Chants de l'armée française, Brandus, Dufour & Cie, 1855

See also

Bibliography
Hermann Ludwig von Jan, "Johann Georg Kastner, ein elsässischer Tondichter, Theoretiker und Musikforscher - sein Werden und Wirken", Breitkopf & Härtel, Leipzig, 1886, 3 vol.
Charles Baechler, New Dictionary of Alsatian biography, vol. 20 Federation of History and Archaeology of Alsace, Strasbourg, 1993, published 1894-1895.

References

External links
 

1810 births
1867 deaths
French male composers
19th-century French composers
19th-century French male musicians